Howard Walter Gilmore (September 29, 1902 – February 7, 1943) was a submarine commander in the United States Navy who posthumously received the Medal of Honor for his self-sacrifice during World War II.

Early life and career
Howard Gilmore was born in Selma, Alabama, on September 29, 1902, and enlisted in the Navy on November 15, 1920. In 1922 he was appointed to the United States Naval Academy by competitive examination. Standing 34th of a class of 436, Gilmore was commissioned in 1926 and reported to the battleship . Gilmore underwent submarine training during 1930 and in the years that followed served in various submarines and at stations ashore.

Gilmore served as the executive officer of the submarine , and in a near-fatal incident during the submarine's shakedown cruise, narrowly survived an assault by a group of thugs in Panama, who cut his throat during an excursion ashore. He had to deal with several other instances of tragedy in his life, including the death of his first wife from disease, and at the time of his Medal of Honor action his second wife was still in a coma from a fall she had taken down a flight of stairs. In 1941, he assumed his first command, USS Shark (SS-174), only to be transferred the day after the attack on Pearl Harbor to command the still-unfinished submarine .

World War II
Gilmore commanded his submarine skillfully during four Pacific War patrols.  During his first, on 5 July 1942  attacked three enemy destroyers off Kiska, sinking one and severely damaging the other two, while narrowly avoiding two torpedoes fired in return, for which Gilmore received the Navy Cross.

During his second patrol,  sank four merchant ships totaling 15,000 tons in the East China Sea near Formosa. Gilmore was awarded a gold star in lieu of a second Navy Cross.

During October 1942,  patrolled off Truk in the Caroline Islands as part of a repositioning of submarine assets on the way to Brisbane, Australia. No significant action occurred.

4th war patrol and Medal of Honor action

The submarine continued to take a heavy toll on shipping on its fourth war patrol, and during the night of 6–7 February 1943, it approached a convoy stealthily for a surface attack. Suddenly a convoy escort named Hayasaki closed and prepared to ram.  As the small ship charged out of the darkness, Gilmore sounded the collision alarm and shouted, "Left full rudder!" — to no avail. Perhaps inadvertently,  hit the Japanese adversary amidships at 17 knots (31 km/h), heeling the submarine 50 degrees, bending 18 feet of its bow sideways to port, and disabling the forward torpedo tubes.

Simultaneously, the Japanese crew began a burst of machine gun fire at Growler'''s bridge, killing the junior officer of the deck and a lookout, while wounding Gilmore himself and two other men. "Clear the bridge!" Gilmore ordered as he struggled to hang on to a frame. As the rest of the bridge party dropped down the hatch into the conning tower, the executive officer, Lieutenant Commander Arnold Schade — shaken by the impact and dazed by his own fall into the control room — waited expectantly for his captain to appear. Instead from above came the shouted command, "Take her down!" Realizing that he could not get below in time if the ship were to escape, Gilmore chose to make the supreme sacrifice for his shipmates. Schade hesitated briefly — then obeyed his captain's last order and submerged the crippled ship.

Surfacing some time later in hope of reattacking the Hayasaki, Schade found the seas empty. The Japanese ship had, in fact, survived the encounter, but there was no sign of Gilmore, who apparently had drifted away during the night. Schade and Growler's crew managed to control the ship's flooding and voyaged back to Brisbane on February 17.

For sacrificing himself to save his ship, Commander Howard Gilmore was posthumously awarded the Medal of Honor, "the second man of the submarine force to be so decorated."

World War II summary

 

 

Awards and decorations

Medal of Honor citation
For distinguished gallantry and valor above and beyond the call of duty as commanding officer of the U.S.S. Growler during her Fourth War Patrol in the Southwest Pacific from 10 January to 7 February 1943. Boldly striking at the enemy in spite of continuous hostile air and antisubmarine patrols, Comdr. Gilmore sank one Japanese freighter and damaged another by torpedo fire, successfully evading severe depth charges following each attack. In the darkness of night on 7 February, an enemy gunboat closed range and prepared to ram the Growler. Comdr. Gilmore daringly maneuvered to avoid the crash and rammed the attacker instead, ripping into her port side at 11 knots and bursting wide her plates. In the terrific fire of the sinking gunboat's heavy machineguns, Comdr. Gilmore calmly gave the order to clear the bridge, and refusing safety for himself, remained on deck while his men preceded him below. Struck down by the fusillade of bullets and having done his utmost against the enemy, in his final living moments, Comdr. Gilmore gave his last order to the officer of the deck, "Take her down". The Growler dived; seriously damaged but under control, she was brought safely to port by her well-trained crew inspired by the courageous fighting spirit of their dead captain.

Even today "Take her down!" remains one of the legendary phrases of the U.S. Submarine Force.

Other posthumous honors
In September 1943, the submarine tender  was named for him and sponsored by his widow.
A cenotaph (photo of stone can be found here) in Commander Gilmore's memory and honor was placed by Ed Shields, Ward Calhoun, and the Lauderdale County Department of Archives and History, Inc. at Magnolia Cemetery, Meridian, Mississippi in the Howard Family Plot. His mother's maiden name was Howard.

Popular culture
Howard Gilmore's sacrifice inspired five different authors and screenwriters.
In the historical notes section epilogue of War and Remembrance (copyright 1978 by Herman Wouk, Library of Congress catalog Card Number 78-17746) Howard Gilmore is recognized by "The death of Carter Aster is based on the famous self-sacrifice of Commander Howard W. Gilmore of the U.S.S. Growler for which he was posthumously awarded the Congressional Medal of Honor".
In the movie Operation Pacific, John Wayne's character as Executive Officer of USS Thunderfish orders Thunderfish submerged, leaving his wounded Commanding Officer (played by Ward Bond) on the bridge. Ward Bond would subsequently appear in a short subject film about Gilmore, The Growler Story (1958), but playing the Chief of Boat (senior NCO) of the Growler with Ken Curtis portraying Gilmore; this was one of a series of USN training films on leadership directed by famed Hollywood director and US Naval Reserve Rear Admiral John Ford.
In the movie Submarine Command, on the last day of World War II William Holden's character as Executive Officer of USS Tiger Shark orders Tiger Shark submerged while under attack from a Japanese destroyer, leaving his wounded Commanding Officer (played by Jack Gregson) on the bridge.
In the movie U-571, Bill Paxton's character Lt. Cmdr. Mike Dahlgren (Captain of the S-33) orders Lt. Andrew Tyler (Played by Matthew McConaughey) to take down the captured German U-boat. Tyler complies, leaving his wounded Commanding Officer in the waters.
In Robb White's novel Up Periscope'', Phil Carney as Executive Officer of USS Shark reluctantly submerges the submarine while under attack from a Japanese airplane, leaving his wounded Commanding Officer Paul Stevenson on the bridge after being ordered to "Take her down".

See also

List of Medal of Honor recipients for World War II

Notes

References

External links
 

1902 births
1943 deaths
Recipients of the Navy Cross (United States)
United States Navy Medal of Honor recipients
United States Naval Academy alumni
United States Navy officers
United States submarine commanders
People from Selma, Alabama
United States Navy personnel killed in World War II
World War II recipients of the Medal of Honor
Captains who went down with the ship
Military personnel from Alabama
People lost at sea